A halter is a type of headgear for leading an animal.

Halter may also refer to:

Halter (surname)
Halter (horse show)
Halter top
Halter (lacewing), a genus of insects in the family Nemopteridae
Halteres, singular halter, small organs found in some insects

See also
Halter hitch, a type of knot
Holter (disambiguation)